{{DISPLAYTITLE:C18H24N2S}}
The molecular formula C18H24N2S (molar mass: 300.462 g/mol) may refer to:

 Fourphit (4-isothiocyanato-1-[1-phenylcyclohexyl]piperidine)
 Metaphit

Molecular formulas